Deep image is a term coined by U.S. poets Jerome Rothenberg and Robert Kelly in the second issue of the magazine Trobar in 1961. They used the term to describe poetry written by Diane Wakoski, Clayton Eshleman, and themselves.

In creating the term, Rothenberg was inspired by the Spanish cante jondo ("deep song"), especially the work of Federico García Lorca and by the symbolist theory of correspondences.

In general, deep image poems are resonant, stylized and heroic in tone. Longer poems tend to be catalogues of free-standing images.

The deep image group was short-lived in the manner that Kelly and Rothenberg defined.

It was later redeveloped by Robert Bly and used by many, such as Galway Kinnell and James Wright. The redevelopment relied on being concrete, not abstract, and to let the images make the experience and to let the images and experience generate the meanings. This new style of Deep Image tended to be narrative, but was often lyrical.

Resources

Literary movements
Modernist poetry in English